HMS Pelican was a  which served with the Royal Navy during the First World War. The M class were an improvement on the preceding , capable of higher speed. Launched on 18 March 1916, the vessel served with the Grand Fleet, taking part in significant actions on 19 August 1916 and 4 May 1917, as well as the fight between the British and German battlecruisers in the Battle of Jutland. The destroyer also undertook the other more general roles were typical of the type, including anti-submarine sweeps and escort duties for convoys. The destroyer had success driving away German submarines but did not sink any. After the end of the war, Pelican initially joined a Local Defence Flotilla but within a year had been placed in reserve and was subsequently sold to be broken up on 9 May 1921.

Design and development
Pelican was one of sixteen s ordered by the British Admiralty in May 1915 as part of the Fifth War Construction Programme. The M-class was an improved version of the earlier  destroyers, designed to reach a higher speed in order to counter rumoured German fast destroyers, although it transpired these vessels did not exist.

Displacement was  normal and  full load.

Armament consisted of three  Mk IV QF guns on the ship's centreline, with one on the forecastle, one aft on a raised platform and one between the middle and aft funnels. A single 2-pounder (40 mm) pom-pom anti-aircraft gun was carried, while torpedo armament consisted of two twin mounts for  torpedoes. The ship had a complement of 76 officers and ratings.

Construction and career
Pelican was laid down by William Beardmore and Company of Dalmuir on 25 June 1915 with the yard number 537, launched on 18 March the following year and completed on 1 April. The vessel was the fifteenth to be named after the birds in the genus Pelecanus to enter naval service since 1646. The ship was deployed as part of the Grand Fleet, joining the newly formed Thirteenth Destroyer Flotilla.

Towards the end of the battle, the destroyer joined the attack, led by the destroyer , on the German battlecruisers as they retreated. Once again, no hits were recorded. On 19 August, the light cruiser  was struck by a torpedo. Pelican was one of three destroyers sent to assist the stricken ship. The destroyer was successful in driving away the submarine.

On 18 January the following year, the destroyer was one of six that undertook what were termed high-speed sweeps, looking for submarines with paravanes. Pelican escaped from this unharmed. The vessel was also involved in escorting merchant ships in the convoys that crossed the Atlantic Ocean.

After the armistice, the Royal Navy returned to a peacetime level of mobilisation. Initially Pelican joined the Local Defence Flotilla at Portsmouth. However, this service did not last long and on 17 October 1919, the destroyer was reduced and placed in the Reserve Fleet. Pelican was sold to Thos. W. Ward on 9 May 1921, arriving at Briton Ferry to be broken up on 5 January 1923.

Pennant numbers

References

Citations

Bibliography

 
 
 
 
 
 
 
 
 
 
 
 
 
 

1916 ships
Admiralty M-class destroyers
Ships built on the River Clyde
World War I destroyers of the United Kingdom